The Hiroshima Raccoons football program, established in 1977, represents Hiroshima University in college football. Hiroshima is a member of the Chushikoku Collegiate American Football Association.

External links
 

American football teams established in 1977
American football in Japan
1977 establishments in Japan